Back to the Bars is a live album by rock musician Todd Rundgren, which was released as a double LP in 1978.

The album was recorded during week-long stints in New York City (The Bottom Line), Los Angeles (The Roxy), and Cleveland (The Agora). The music featured the best of Rundgren's most commercial work spanning seven of the eight solo albums released in the 1970s up to, but not including, his most recent at the time. This effort was in place of rumors of a re-release of his out-of-print first two LPs, Runt, and Runt. The Ballad of Todd Rundgren. The only offering from those were "The Range War", and the bulk of the material came from Something/Anything?, A Wizard, a True Star, Todd, Initiation, and Faithful. The finale included past and present members of Rundgren's Utopia: Roger Powell, Kasim Sulton, John Wilcox, John Siegler, Ralph Schuckett and Moogy Klingman. Also joining in were the Hello People: Norman Smart, Greg Geddes, Bobby Sedita, and Larry Tasse. Special guest stars were Rick Derringer, Spencer Davis, Daryl Hall, John Oates, and Stevie Nicks.

Despite a hard push to replicate the success of Frampton Comes Alive!, Back to the Bars did not generate any significant singles or lift for Rundgren.

Track listing

All tracks written by Todd Rundgren; except where indicated.

Charts

Personnel

Sides 1 and 4 (except hello it's me)
 Todd Rundgren – lead vocals, guitar, piano on "A Dream Goes on Forever"
 Utopia:	
 Roger Powell – keyboards, synthesizers, vocals
 Kasim Sulton – bass, vocals
 John Wilcox – drums, vocals

Sides 2 and 3
 Todd Rundgren – lead vocals, guitar
 Moogy Klingman – piano
 John Siegler – bass
 John Wilcox – drums, vocals
 The Hello People:
 Greg Geddes – lead, backing vocals
 Bobby Sedita – rhythm guitar, saxophone, vocals
 Norman Smart – drums on "The Range War", vocals
 Larry Tasse – synthesizer, vocals

Guest artists
 Spencer Davis – harmonica on "The Range War"
 Ralph Schuckett – organ on "I Saw the Light" Medley
 Rick Derringer – guitar on "Hello It's Me"
 Stevie Nicks, Daryl Hall, John Oates, Kasim Sulton, Spencer Davis – vocals on "Hello It's Me"

Technical notes
 Hipgnosis – sleeve design and photography
 Richard Creamer, Chuck Pulin, Kevin and Michael Ricker – live photography
 Rob Davis –	guitar technician
 Paul Lester – liner notes
 Tom Edmonds –	mixing
 Todd Rundgren – production, mixing

References

Albums with cover art by Hipgnosis
Albums produced by Todd Rundgren
Todd Rundgren albums
1978 live albums
Albums recorded at the Bottom Line
Albums recorded at the Roxy Theatre
Bearsville Records live albums
Rhino Records live albums